House of Flowers is a musical by Harold Arlen (music and lyrics) and Truman Capote (lyrics and book). A short story of the same name was published in Breakfast at Tiffany's (1958).

Synopsis
The story concerns two neighboring bordellos that battle for business in an idealized Haitian setting. One of the sex workers, Ottilie, turns down a rich lord to marry a poor mountain boy named Royal. Her madam plots to keep her by having Royal sealed in a barrel and tossed into the ocean. Royal escapes the watery death by taking refuge on the back of a turtle. The lovers are eventually married and live happily ever after.

Production history
This was Capote's first musical, and was the first theatrical production outside of Trinidad and Tobago to feature the new Caribbean instrument—the steel pan. It was produced by Saint Subber who was also responsible for Kiss Me, Kate and seven plays by Neil Simon.

In the early 1950s Truman Capote became further involved in the performing arts. He was approached once again by producer Saint Subber, who was interested in his recent story "House of Flowers": would he be interested in adapting the work as a musical play for Broadway? Despite the difficulties they had had in turning "The Grass Harp" into a stage play, Capote agreed for a second time to collaborate with producer Saint Subber and set to work. Much of the writing was done in the Italian fishing village of Portofino; but Capote and Jack Dunphy found time to travel to Switzerland and Paris before turning to America, where Capote met again with Saint Subber and continued his work in the musical. After a Philadelphia try-out, the show opened on Broadway on December 30, 1954 at the Alvin Theatre and played for 165 performances. The director was Peter Brook. The cast included Pearl Bailey, Diahann Carroll, Juanita Hall, Ray Walston, Carmen de Lavallade, Alvin Ailey, Mary Mon Toy, and Geoffrey Holder (who also provided a section of choreography and went on to direct the 1992 revival starring Patti LaBelle).  Most of the original orchestral score by Ted Royal has been lost, but the piano score survives.

Reception and legacy
Although the show received generally poor reviews, the dance-rhythm infused score has been praised for its mix of blues and calypso.

Oliver Messel won the Tony Award for Best Scenic Design.

In 2003, Columbia Masterworks reissued the original cast recording. In addition to such tunes as “A Sleepin' Bee” and “Don’t Like Goodbyes,” the CD also included bonus tracks of “Mardis Gras Waltz” (Percy Faith and His Orchestra), “Two Ladies in the Shade” (Enid Mosier), “Ottilie and the Bee” (Truman Capote), and “A Sleepin’ Bee” (a demo recording by Harold Arlen).

Revivals
There was an unsuccessful Off-Broadway revival in 1968 at Theater de Lys. In 2003, there was an Encores! production, starring Tonya Pinkins and Armelia McQueen as the battling bordello madams and Maurice Hines as Captain Jonas, the smuggler. The virginal Ottilie was played by Nikki M. James, and the mountain boy, Royal, was played by Brandon Victor Dixon. Roscoe Lee Browne played the voodoo priest, Houngan.

Musical numbers

Act 1
 "Waitin'" — Pansy, Tulip and Gladiola
 "One Man Ain't Quite Enough" — Madame Fleur
 "Madame Tango's Tango" — Madame Tango and Tango Belles
 "A Sleepin' Bee" — Ottilie alias Violet, Pansy, Tulip and Gladiola
 "Bamboo Cage" — The Champion, the Steel Band, Do, Don't, Pansy, Tulip, Gladiola, Madame Tango, Chief of Police and the Ensemble
 "House of Flowers" — Royal and Ottilie
 "Two Ladies in de Shade of de Banana Tree" — Pansy, Gladiola, Carmen, Tulip and the Ensemble
 "What Is a Friend For?" — Madame Fleur
 "A Sleepin' Bee (Reprise)" — Ottilie and Royal
 "Mardi Gras" — Mother, Carmen, Alvin and the Ensemble
 "I Never Has Seen Snow" — Ottilie

Act II
 "Husband Cage" — Pansy, Tulip, Gladiola and the Ensemble
 "Has I Let You Down?" — Madame Fleur, Pansy, Tulip and Gladiola
 "Voudou" — Houngan and the Ensemble
 "Slide, Boy, Slide" — Madame Tango, Alvin and the Ensemble
 "Don't Like Goodbyes" — Madame Fleur
 "Turtle Song" — Royal, Ottilie and the Ensemble
 "Bamboo Cage (Reprise)" - The Company
 "Two Ladies in de Shade of de Banana Tree (Reprise)" - The Company

References

External links
 
Official soundtrack playlist on YouTube
Scathing review at the Musicals101.com site

Broadway musicals
1954 musicals
Musicals by Harold Arlen
Musicals by Truman Capote
Musicals based on short fiction
Tony Award-winning musicals